Mi Verdadero Amor (Eng: My True Love) is a studio album released by Grupo Bryndis. All songs were composed by the group members.

Track list
 
Mi Verdadero Amor 3:47 (Claudio Pablo Montaño) 
Quiero Volver a Verte 3:17 (Gerardo Izaguirre) 
Por Estar Pensando en Ti 3:57 (Mauro Posadas) 
Marchate 4:09 (Jose Guadalupe Guevara) 
Pagando Mi Error 3:42 (Juan Guevara) 
Me Hace Falta Tu Amor 3:58 (Juan Guevara) 
El Perdedor 3:44 (Mauro Posadas) 
Recordandote 4:05 (Juan Guevara) 
Despedida Triste 3:03 (Jose Guadalupe Guevara) 
Como Duele Tu Adios 3:54 (Mauro Posadas)

Grupo Bryndis albums
1996 albums
Disa Records albums